Athletics is one of the sports at the quadrennial Jeux de la Francophonie (Francophone Games) competition. It has been one of the sports held at the event since the inaugural edition in 1989.

Editions

Jeux de la Francophonie records

Men

Women

References

External links
Results 1989–2005 from GBR Athletics
Past medallists from the official website 
Women's records 
Men's records 

 
Jeux de la Francophonie
Sports at the Jeux de la Francophonie